Hypsotropa pervittella is a species of snout moth in the genus Hypsotropa. It was described by George Hampson in 1918 and is known from Punjab and Bombay in India.

References

Moths described in 1918
Anerastiini